Dragon Trap is a 2010 Turkish crime-thriller film, directed by Uğur Yücel, about two detectives investigating a series of murders of released pedophiles, which was sponsored by the Istanbul Police Department.

Production 
The eight-week shoot started on June 15, 2009 and included seven weeks in Istanbul and one week in Erzincan, Turkey. A French team came to Turkey to contribute to the production.

Plot
Ensar (Nejat İşler) has turned into a ruthless death machine during his military service, during which he fought terrorists in numerous clashes in southeast Anatolia. Having just completed his compulsory military service, Ensar returns home, but on the very day he comes home, he finds out that while he was away, his 12-year-old sister was raped. Later, unable to cope with the trauma, the little girl hanged herself at a mental asylum she was put in following the incident. In the meantime, Ensar's hometown is shaken with a number of murders. Two skillful detectives from the homicide department, Abbas (Uğur Yücel) and “Akrep” Celal (Kenan İmirzalıoğlu), along with rookie Ezo (Berrak Tüzünataç) are assigned to investigate the murders. The case will be the last one Abbas has to solve before the retirement he has been anticipating for a long time to put into practice his plans to move to a quiet and far away place with his longtime girlfriend Cavidan (Ceyda Düvenci).

Cast
Uğur Yücel ('Çerkez' Abbas) 
Kenan İmirzalıoğlu ('Akrep' Celal) 
Nejat İşler (Ensar) 
Berrak Tüzünataç (Ezo) 
Ceyda Düvenci (Cavidan) 
Ayşe Nil Şamlıoğlu (Ensar's mother)
Ozan Güven (Remzi)
İlker Aksum (Doctor)

Release

Reception

Box office
The film was number two at the Turkish box office for two weeks running and has made a total gross of $4,644,486.

See also 
 2010 in film
 Turkish films of 2010

References

External links
Official site

2010 films
2010s Turkish-language films
2010 crime thriller films
2010 crime action films
Films set in Turkey
Films set in Istanbul
Turkish crime thriller films